The Serbian secret organization in eastern Bosnia was a Serb secret revolutionary organization active in 1849–55 in the eastern Bosnia Eyalet–the kaza of Srebrenica, Višegrad, Rogatica and Nova Varoš. It was part of a larger network of organizations active in Ottoman Europe (Rumelia), envisaged by Serbian politician Ilija Garašanin. The aim of the organization was to prepare an uprising against Ottoman rule. Pavle Marinović was responsible for eastern Bosnia, and was subordinated to Toma Kovačević, Garašanin's man responsible for Bosnia as a whole. Marinović established the organization network in the four kazas in eastern Bosnia in the second half of 1849 and in 1850, and appointed chiefs of each kaza that reported on numbers of Orthodox and Muslim men, the relief, strategical objects and Ottoman military forces. It was concluded that half of the Serb population there were well-armed and ready to revolt. However, as Serbia did not pursue a war of liberation against the Ottomans, in 1851 the organization turned into an intelligence agency. The organization's failure was largely due to lack of funds.

Members
The following were members whose names and duties are known:
Pavle Marinović, organizer
Vuk Nešković, chief in Višegrad kaza
Sava Jovičić, chief in Višegrad kaza, also duty in Nova Varoš
Filip Ravanac, chief in Srebrenica kaza
Petar Borovčan, chief in Srebrenica kaza
Ilija Borovčan, chief in Srebrenica kaza
Nikola, chief in Srebrenica kaza
Mihailo Soldat, chief in Srebrenica kaza
Marko, priest of Lipovac, chief in Vlasenica kaza
Ilija, priest of Glasinac, chief in Glasinac kaza

See also
Serb revolutionary organizations
Secret society

References

Sources

Serbian revolutionary organizations
Revolutionary organizations against the Ottoman Empire
Organizations established in 1849
Organizations disestablished in the 1850s
1840s establishments in Serbia
Defunct organizations based in Serbia
19th century in Bosnia and Herzegovina
History of the Serbs of Bosnia and Herzegovina
Serbs from the Ottoman Empire
Principality of Serbia
Secret societies in Serbia
Serbian nationalism in Bosnia and Herzegovina